A sternwalk is a balcony on the outside of the hull on the stern of a ship, usually reserved for the highest-ranking officer on board. They became less common on warships in the twentieth century.

References 

Nautical terminology